The CN2 induction algorithm is a learning algorithm for rule induction. It is designed to work even when the training data is imperfect. It is based on ideas from the AQ algorithm and the ID3 algorithm. As a consequence it creates a rule set like that created by AQ but is able to handle noisy data like ID3.

Description of algorithm
The algorithm must be given a set of examples, TrainingSet, which have already been classified in order to generate a list of classification rules. A set of conditions, SimpleConditionSet, which can be applied, alone or in combination, to any set of examples is predefined to be used for the classification.

 routine CN2(TrainingSet)
    let the ClassificationRuleList be empty
    repeat
       let the BestConditionExpression be Find_BestConditionExpression(TrainingSet)
       if the BestConditionExpression is not nil
          then
             let the TrainingSubset be the examples covered by the BestConditionExpression
             remove from the TrainingSet the examples in the TrainingSubset
             let the MostCommonClass be the most common class of examples in the TrainingSubset
             append to the ClassificationRuleList the rule
                'if ' the BestConditionExpression ' then the class is ' the MostCommonClass
    until the TrainingSet is empty or the BestConditionExpression is nil
 return the ClassificationRuleList

 routine Find_BestConditionExpression(TrainingSet)
    let the ConditionalExpressionSet be empty
    let the BestConditionExpression be nil
    repeat
       let the TrialConditionalExpressionSet be the set of conditional expressions,
          {x and y where x belongs to the ConditionalExpressionSet and y belongs to the SimpleConditionSet}.
       remove all formulae in the TrialConditionalExpressionSet that are either in the ConditionalExpressionSet (i.e.,
           the unspecialized ones) or null (e.g., big = y and big = n)
       for every expression, F, in the TrialConditionalExpressionSet
          if
             F is statistically significant
                and F is better than the BestConditionExpression
                by user-defined criteria when tested on the TrainingSet
             then
                replace the current value of the BestConditionExpression by F
       while the number of expressions in the TrialConditionalExpressionSet > user-defined maximum
          remove the worst expression from the TrialConditionalExpressionSet
       let the ConditionalExpressionSet be the TrialConditionalExpressionSet
    until the ConditionalExpressionSet is empty
 return the BestConditionExpression

References

External links
  CN2 Algorithm Description

Machine learning algorithms